Ekaterina Makarova and Elena Vesnina successfully defended their title, defeating Anna-Lena Grönefeld and Květa Peschke in the final, 6–0, 6–4.

Seeds
The top four seeds received a bye into the second round.

Draw

Finals

Top half

Bottom half

References
Main Draw

Women's Doubles